Philip Jenkins (born April 3, 1952) is a professor of history at Baylor University in the United States, and co-director for Baylor's Program on Historical Studies of Religion in the Institute for Studies of Religion. He is also the Edwin Erle Sparks Professor of Humanities Emeritus at Pennsylvania State University (PSU). He was professor (from 1993) and a distinguished professor (from 1997) of history and religious studies at the same institution; and also assistant, associate and then full professor of criminal justice and American studies at PSU, 1980–93.

Jenkins is a contributing editor for The American Conservative and writes a monthly column for The Christian Century. He has also written articles for Christianity Today, First Things, and The Atlantic.

Early life and work
Jenkins was born in Port Talbot, Wales, in 1952, and studied at Clare College, Cambridge, taking double first–class honours in both History and  Anglo-Saxon, Norse and Celtic Studies. Jenkins then studied for his PhD under the supervision of Sir John Plumb among others. Between 1977 and 1980, Jenkins worked as a researcher for Sir Leon Radzinowicz, the pioneer of criminology studies at Cambridge.

In 1979, Jenkins won the BBC quiz show  Mastermind.

Academic career
In 1980, Jenkins was appointed Assistant Professor of Criminal Justice at Pennsylvania State University, which marked a change in his research focus. Jenkins has forged a reputation based on his work on global Christianity as well as on emerging religious movements. Other research interests include post-1970 American history and crime.

He conducted a study of the Quran and the Bible in the light of the September 11 attacks and accusations that the Quran incites violence. However, he found that "the Bible contains far more verses praising or urging bloodshed than does the Quran." (See also Violence in the Bible and Violence in the Quran).

Public intellectual
In 2002 Jenkins, a Catholic-turned-Episcopalian, discussed the Catholic sex abuse cases by asserting that his "research of cases over the past 20 years indicates no evidence whatever that Catholic or other celibate clergy are any more likely to be involved in misconduct or abuse than clergy of any other denomination—or indeed, than non-clergy. However determined news media may be to see this affair as a crisis of celibacy, the charge is just unsupported."

In a 2010 interview with National Public Radio, Jenkins stated that he believes that "the Islamic scriptures in the Quran  were actually far less bloody and less violent than those in the Bible" and cites explicit instructions in the Old Testament calling for genocide while the Quran calls for primarily defensive war. Jenkins went on to state that Christianity, Islam, and Judaism had undergone a process that he refers to as "holy amnesia" in which violence in sacred texts became symbolic action against one's sins. Islam had until recently also undergone the same process in which jihad became an internal struggle rather than war.

Bibliography
  353 pp. 
  211 pp.
  451 pp.
  262 pp.
  262 pp.
  214 pp.
  317 pp.
  343 pp.
  302 pp.
  271 pp.
  247 pp.
  294 pp.
  259 pp.
  260 pp.
  270 pp. (translated into many languages, including Chinese in Taiwan).
  227 pp.
  258 pp.
  306 pp.
  344 pp.
  193 pp.
  353 pp.
 
  328 pp.
  320 pp.
  448 pp.
 The Many Faces of Christ: The Thousand Year Story of the Survival and Influence of the Lost Gospels. New York: Basic Books, 2015. . 336 pp.
  336 pp.

References

External links

Personal website
Interview with Philip Jenkins on "The Lost History of Christianity"

1952 births
Alumni of Clare College, Cambridge
American Episcopalians
Living people
Pennsylvania State University faculty
Welsh emigrants to the United States
20th-century Welsh historians
Converts to Anglicanism from Roman Catholicism
Carnegie Council for Ethics in International Affairs
Baylor University faculty